This is a list of the 18 members of the European Parliament for Austria in the 2014 to 2019 session.

List

Party representation

Notes

2014
Austria
List